John Bruce Howell (June 17, 1941 – February 28, 1997) was an American librarian and bibliographer. He was Africana and International Studies Bibliographer at the University of Iowa Libraries, a profilfic bibliographic author, and "a national leader in Africana librarianship".

Life
Howell gained his B.A. from Columbia University in 1965 and an M.A. in library science from the University of Michigan the following year. Between 1969 and 1980 he held various positions at the Library of Congress. In 1984 he completed a PhD in library and information science from the University of Illinois Urbana-Champaign, and he joined the University of Iowa in 1985.

Works
 East African Community: subject guide to official publications, (Library of Congress, 1976)
 Tanganyika African National Union: a guide to publications by and about TANU, (Library of Congress, 1976)
 Kenya: subject guide to official publications, (Library of Congress, 1978)
 Zanzibar's Afro-Shirazi Party, 1957-1977: a bibliography, (Library of Congress, 1978)
 Style manuals of the English-speaking world: a guide, 1983 
 A history of the Dublin Library Society, 1791-1881, 1985 
 Third World/Iowa: books, journals, maps, and microforms about 138 developing countries acquired by the University of Iowa Libraries, 1980-1986, 1987 
 Rural health in Kenya: a guide to the literature, 1988 
 Index to the African studies review/bulletin and the ASA review of books, 1958-1990, 1991 
 Guides, collections, and ancillary materials to African archival resources in the United States, 1996

References

1941 births
1997 deaths
American librarians
American bibliographers
American Africanists
20th-century American non-fiction writers
University of Michigan School of Information alumni
Columbia University School of Library Service alumni
University of Illinois School of Information Sciences alumni